Mikhail Mikhaylovich Ivanov (23 September 184920 October 1927) was a Russian composer, critic and writer of music.

Biography
Mikhail Mikhaylovich Ivanov was born in Moscow in 1849. He studied at the Technological Institute, St Petersburg, then at the Moscow Conservatory for a year, under Pyotr Ilyich Tchaikovsky (harmony) and Alexandre Dubuque (piano). He lived the next six years of his life in Rome, where he associated with Franz Liszt and his pupils and studied with Giovanni Sgambati. He returned to Russia and became a music critic with the Novoye Vremya.

Many of his compositions were performed, but not published. Arias from his opera Zabava Puytatishna (1899) have been recorded by Olimpia Boronat, Eugenia Bronskaya and Leonid Sobinov. His liturgical piece The Lord's Prayer has been recorded by Nicolai Gedda.

He died in Rome in 1927.

Musical works

 Potemkin's Feast (or Potemkin's Holiday), opera (1888; 16 December 1902, St Petersburg)
 Zabava Putyatishna, opera (1899; 15 January 1899, Moscow)
 The Proud Woman, opera (not prod.)
 Woe to the Wise, opera (19 April 1910, Mariinsky Theatre, Saint Petersburg)
 La Vestale (a.k.a. Vyestalka), ballet (choreography by Marius Petipa; 29 February 1888; Mariinsky Theatre, St Petersburg)
 A Night in May, symphonic poem
 Savonarola, symphonic poem
 Suite champêtre
 A Requiem, symphonic prologue
 Medea, incidental music
 three orchestral suites
 several cantatas
 songs
 piano pieces

Literary works
 Pushkin in Music, monograph (1900)
 Historic Development of Music in Russia (1910–11, 2 v.)

Translations
 Eduard Hanslick's Vom Musikalisch-Schönen
 Nohl's Entwicklung der Kammermusik

References

Sources
 Alexandria Vodarsky-Shiraeff, Russian Composers and Musicians
 Grove's Dictionary of Music and Musicians, 5th ed., 1954, Eric Blom, ed.

1849 births
1927 deaths
Russian male classical composers
Russian music critics
Russian opera composers
Male opera composers
Russian ballet composers
White Russian emigrants to Italy
20th-century Russian translators
Emigrants from the Russian Empire to Italy